The office of the Governor of Kosrae is the highest position in the state of Kosrae, Federated States of Micronesia.

History of the office holders follows.

References

Kosrae
1979 establishments in the Trust Territory of the Pacific Islands